Stars: The Best Of Dubstar is a compilation album by British dance-pop band, Dubstar, released in April 2004. The album contains a hidden track: a remix of "Stars", following (but on the same track as) "Self Same Thing". All songs written by Steve Hillier except where noted.

Track listing
"Stars" [Original Mix]
"Anywhere" (Hillier, Wilkie)
"The Day I See You Again" 
"Jealousy" (Tennant, Lowe)
"Just A Girl She Said" (Blackwood, Hillier, Wilkie)
"Elevator Song"
"Not So Manic Now"
"No More Talk"
"I Will Be Your Girlfriend" (Hillier, Wilkie)
"In Charge (From Shooting Fish)" (Hillier, Wilkie)
"Cathedral Park"
"Ghost"
"Can't Tell Me" (Wilkie)
"I (Friday Night)"
"The Self Same Thing"

Alternate Track listing
"Stars" [Original Mix]
"Anywhere" (Hillier, Wilkie)
"The Day I See You Again"
"Just A Girl She Said" (Blackwood, Hillier, Wilkie)
"Elevator Song" [Acoustic Version]
"Not So Manic Now"
"No More Talk"
"I Will Be Your Girlfriend" (Hillier, Wilkie)
"Cathedral Park"
"Can't Tell Me" (Wilkie)
"Ghost"
"When the World Knows Your Name" [Demo Version]
"I (Friday Night)"
"The Self Same Thing"
"Swansong" (including hidden track "Stars" [Acoustic Version])

External links

Stars: The Best of Dubstar at YouTube (streamed copy where licensed)

Dubstar albums
2007 greatest hits albums